Paolo Fernandes Cantin (born 19 August 1998) is a Spanish professional footballer who plays for Greek Super League club AEK Athens. Mainly a left winger, he also plays as an attacking midfielder.

Club career

Manchester City
Born in Zaragoza, Aragon to a Capeverdean father, Fernandes started his career at Real Zaragoza. In 2013, aged 15, he joined Manchester City after being invited to train for the squad. Zaragoza later claimed to the Royal Spanish Football Federation that the player was not allowed to join City, and the English club agreed to pay a compensation fee for the move (rumoured to be € 180,000); despite still training at City, he was only registered in August 2014 when he reached the age of 16.

Initially assigned to the under-18 squad, Fernandes progressed through the EDS and represented the under-21s and under-23s. With the latter side he scored 11 goals in 22 appearances in the 2016–17 Premier League 2 Division 1.

Loan to NAC Breda
On 24 June 2017, after finishing his formation, Fernandes, Thierry Ambrose and fellow compatriot Pablo Marí were loaned to Eredivisie side Breda. He made his professional debut on 12 August, coming on as a half-time substitute for Giovanni Korte in a 1–4 away loss against Vitesse.

Fernandes scored his first professional goal on 3 December 2017, netting his team's third in a 3–1 home win against Excelsior. The following 12 July, his loan was extended for a further season, but only contributed with eight league appearances.

Loan to Perugia
On 17 July 2019, Fernandes joined Italian Serie B side Perugia on loan for the 2019–20 season. He appeared in 16 league matches overall, totalling ten starts.

Castellón
Fernandes joined Segunda División newcomers Castellón on 3 September 2020, signing a three-year contract.

Volos

On 29 June 2021, he was announced from the Greek Super League club Volos as their newest addition, their 7th transfer for the upcoming season, until now, with a brief announcement that does not disclose the duration of the contract signed. On 19 September 2021, he scored his first goal in a 3–1 away win against Apollon Smyrnis.

AEK Athens
On 15 September 2022, Fernandes signed a four-year contract with Greek Super League club AEK Athens. The player will join the club permanently on 1 January 2023.

Career statistics

References

External links

1998 births
Living people
Footballers from Zaragoza
Spanish people of Cape Verdean descent
Spanish sportspeople of African descent
Association football wingers
Association football midfielders
Spanish footballers
Segunda División players
CD Castellón footballers
Manchester City F.C. players
Eredivisie players
NAC Breda players
Volos N.F.C. players
AEK Athens F.C. players
Super League Greece players
Serie B players
A.C. Perugia Calcio players
Spanish expatriate footballers
Spanish expatriate sportspeople in England
Spanish expatriate sportspeople in the Netherlands
Spanish expatriate sportspeople in Italy
Spanish expatriate sportspeople in Greece
Expatriate footballers in England
Expatriate footballers in the Netherlands
Expatriate footballers in Italy
Expatriate footballers in Greece